The God Particle may refer to:

 Higgs boson, a particle in physics sometimes referred to as the God particle
 The God Particle (book), a 1993 popular science book by Leon M. Lederman and Dick Teresi 
 The God Particle (EP), by the band BUN
 The Cloverfield Paradox, a 2018 American science fiction thriller film originally titled God Particle

See also
 Oh-My-God particle, an ultra-high-energy cosmic ray detected in 1991 over Dugway Proving Ground, Utah, US